The white-bellied cinclodes (Cinclodes palliatus) is a species of bird in the ovenbird family, Furnariidae. It is endemic to Peru where it inhabits high level, marshy grassland in the Junín Region and possibly also in the Huancavelica Region. This is a very large furnariid with dark upper parts and gleaming white underparts. It is a rare bird with very specific habitat requirements and is threatened by habitat destruction. The International Union for Conservation of Nature has assessed it as being "critically endangered".

Description
The white-bellied cinclodes is larger and has a longer tail than other members of its genus and more resembles a mockingbird than a typical Cinclodes. The crown is brownish-grey, the upper parts and wings rufous-brown with a broad white wing bar, and the underparts pure white. This bird's song is a rapid chattering "pipipipipi pi pi" that sometimes speeds up into a piping, higher-pitched "wee wee wee wee wee".

Distribution and habitat
This species is known only from a high altitude strip of land in Junín Region in Peru. It has previously also been recorded in the Huancavelica Region but recent surveys of that area have failed to find it. It has very specific habitat requirements; it needs mineral-rich, boggy terrain where such cushion plants as Distichia grow, with crags and rocky slopes nearby. This habitat is often found near the foot of glaciers, but there is much apparently suitable habitat where the birds are not present.

Ecology
The white-bellied cinclodes forages in pairs or small groups, pushing its beak into the wet ground to find worms and other invertebrates. Its breeding habits are not well known, but the nest is usually hidden in a rock crevice.

Status
As a result of a survey in 2003, the number of birds was estimated to be in the range 200–1000. No previously unknown locations were found. Between 2008 and 2011, further survey work was undertaken; 104 bogs were visited and 113 birds were recorded inhabiting 18 of them, giving an estimated total population of birds of under 300. Their habitat is being disturbed by mining activities and the dumping of spoil from mines, the extraction of peat, and overgrazing by alpacas, llamas and sheep. If these activities continue there is a poor outlook for the birds, and as a result the International Union for Conservation of Nature have assessed them as being "critically endangered".

References

white-bellied cinclodes
Birds of the Peruvian Andes
Endemic birds of Peru
white-bellied cinclodes
Taxonomy articles created by Polbot